Asian Montessori Center Inc., commonly known by its initials AMC, is a private school in the Philippines that offers education from preschool to Grade school. The campus is located at St. Dominic Villa, San Agustin Village San Fernando City.

History 
Village Montessori Center was established in Corazon Village for 2 years where it stayed in a rented house for 2 years, housed with 17 CASA Pupils with 2 rooms founded by Erlinda B. Mamangun. The original intention was to offer CASA Classes only but the persistent requests from parents inspired the administration to offer Grade School.

A new building was constructed on the school's present site at St. Dominic Villa, Village Montessori was changed to ASIAN MONTESSORI CENTER, Grade levels are added each year from Grades 1 to Grade 6.

The year 1986 was special for Asian Montessori, the first communion was especially memorable, it had to be postponed twice because of the 4 day EDSA revolution that ended a 20 year dictatorship, the graduation ceremonies also flowed abundantly with tearful and emotional ceremonies.

The year 1992 was the worst tragedy to ever befall Asian Montessori Center, the sudden death of our founders, Mrs. Erlinda Mamangun and her husband, Mr. Bienvenido Mamangun. A small ray of sunshine, however broke the fall when 3 of our examinees passed the Philippine Science High School Entrance Examinations.

Mrs. Lynette Ann Mamangun Claros, who was known as Ms. Lynette Claros at that time, elder of the 2 sisters, took over as President of the School.

The year 1995-96 brought another disaster to Asian Montessori Center, the eruption of lahar by Mount Pinatubo, many families had to relocate and many lives were not spared. Fortunately, the enrollment number went up by the succeeding years

Another Mamangun daughter, Ms. Lynn Amor Manalese also joined the administration.

The school year 1998 enjoyed the highest number of graduates, it was 71. This was surpassed 20 years later, with a record of 76.
The most enrollments recorded was 556.

The year 2001 to present is what made the school to be, air conditioning was added to each room and a new building was constructed, a 2 floor building now houses the CASA levels and the other building houses the Grade School levels.

Curriculum 
Asian Montessori utilizes the revolutionary Montessori Education Method of Dr. Maria Montessori. The CASA levels offer oral and practical activities. Mathematics, Zoology, Biology and Language Arts are taught in this level. The Grade School are provided with the necessary tools for their High School life.

References 

High schools in Metro Manila
Montessori schools in the Philippines
Schools in Pampanga